Bawanbir is a village, in Sangrampur tehsil of Buldhana district, Maharashtra State, India.

Geography
It is located at foothill of Satpuda Range and located on MH State Highway 173

Demographics
6000

Description 
T town post office Postal Index Number (PIN code) is 444204 and PIN is shared with Banoda Eklara,  Kated Kolad, Ladnapur, Sonala post offices.

Some of nearby villages are Shivani, Saykhed, Alewadi, Ladnapur, Tunki, Sagoda, Palsoda, Warkhed, Dhamangaon, Palsi Zasi, Kolad, Banoda Eklara, Wadgaon Pr Adgaon, Kakanwada Bk, Kakanwada Kh, Niwana, Warwat Bakal, Jamod, Warkhed, Saundala, Raikhed, Malegaon Bazar,

Nearby town are Sonala, Sangrampur, Telhara, Shegaon
.

References

Villages in Buldhana district